The Jed Water is a river and a tributary of the River Teviot in the Borders region of Scotland.

It flows into the Teviot near Jedfoot Bridge two miles north of Jedburgh. Jed Water rises from a source on Carlin Tooth  in the Cheviot Hills where it is first known as Raven Burn.

Description
The river in past times was the main source of water for the monks living in Jedburgh Abbey. It also powered a watermill in the town of Jedburgh although this no longer exists. It gives its name to Jedburgh and Jedforest. In the 1800s it had trout in the river. The Ordnance gazetteer said Jed Water "in the parts immediately above the town of Jedburgh ... more of the elements of fine landscape than during a whole day's ride in the most favourite Scottish haunts of tourists." The guide drew attention to the pure waters, the brisk currents, the steep landscapes and the contrasts which it thought picturesque.

The name Jed is of obscure origin. James has suggested that it may derive from Proto-Indo-European *wei(h1)- d- "a bend, something curved or twisted". He also notes that Scots Gedde- in Jedburgh may have been adopted from Cumbric  gwï:δ "a wood", and that the river name may be a back-formation.

In 1787 James Hutton created modern geology when he discovered Hutton's Unconformity at Inchbonny, Jedburgh, in layers of sedimentary rock on the banks of the Jed Water. He later wrote of how he "rejoiced at my good fortune in stumbling upon an object so interesting in the natural history of the earth, and which I had been long looking for in vain".

Flooding
Jed Water is liable to flood, so the river levels are monitored near the old Canongate Bridge. In 2020 there was a problem when the flood defences in Jedburgh were breached by debris in one storm just before another storm hit. Luckily repairs were made and serious flooding was avoided.

See also
Borders Abbeys Way
List of places in the Scottish Borders
List of places in Scotland

References

External links

RCAHMS record of the Jed Water
SCRAN image: The Jed Water, winter 1961/2
Gazetteer for Scotland: Jed Water
Streetmap of the Jed Water
GEOGRAPH: Mossburn Ford, Jed Water

Rivers of the Scottish Borders
2Jed
Jedburgh